Curtis Hancock "Curt" Coleman (February 18, 1887July 1, 1980) was a Major League Baseball player. Coleman played third base for the New York Highlanders in 1912. He played in 12 games, with nine hits in 37 at-bats, with four RBIs. He had a batting average of .243.

Coleman was the first major leaguer to come from the University of Oregon.

He was born in Salem, Oregon and died in Newport, Oregon.

External links

New York Highlanders players
1887 births
1980 deaths
Baseball players from Oregon
Major League Baseball third basemen
Sportspeople from Salem, Oregon
People from Newport, Oregon
Portland Beavers players
Tacoma Tigers players
Vancouver Beavers players
Oregon Ducks baseball players